Needham High School is a public high school in Needham, Massachusetts, educating grades 9 through 12. Aaron Sicotte is the principal of Needham High School. Its three assistant principals are Alison Coubrough-Argentieri, Mary Kay Alessi, and Pierre Jean. As of 2016, the school had 1,644 students and over 201 part-time and full-time instructional staff members, plus support staff employees. Needham High School was awarded a gold medal by U.S. News & World Report for its academic excellence. The school is ranked as the 11th best for Massachusetts and 307th best nationally on U.S. News & World Report’s list of best high schools in 2016.

History
Needham High School is situated on a hill overlooking Memorial Park, and is located at approximately the geographical center of town. The original building was dedicated in 1930. As a result of the town's rapid growth following World War II, additions were opened in 1955 and in 1967. These newer additions were demolished in 2008 due to renovation of the school. The school underwent a $62-million renovation consisting of a new wing which was opened in the fall of 2006 and another smaller wing opened in the fall of 2007. The renovated high school offers laboratory facilities, computer equipment, and Smart Boards throughout the school. The high school underwent another renovation in 2018 that repaired much of the A-gym, replace non-working HVAC systems, and added another section to the school which provided six additional classrooms and a new main office. This recent renovation costed $13,188,000 and was completed in late December of 2018.

Governing bodies
Each year the four classes hold elections to determine class president, vice-president, secretary, treasurer, and three class representatives. The collective term for these positions is Student Council, and each class's Student Council is responsible for community and fundraising activities for the class, including bake sales, semi formal dances, and charity donations.
Other governing bodies include the Teacher Advisory Board, the School Council, and the School Committee.

Extracurricular activities

Sports
Students in Needham participate in athletic activities throughout the school year. Needham High School is a member of the Bay State Conference of the Massachusetts Interscholastic Athletic Association and Needham competes with other towns in the state. The schools colors are gold, navy blue and white.  The Needham High School mascot is a rocket, chosen in the 1950s based on Cold War tensions.  Prior to that, the school's mascot was a pansy, based on the town flower.

Fall sports

Football (Varsity, JV, Freshman)
Boys' and Girls' soccer (Varsity, JV, Freshman) 
Field hockey (Varsity, JV, Freshman)
Girls' volleyball (Varsity, JV, Freshman)
Girls' swimming and diving (Varsity, JV)
Cross country (Varsity, JV) 
Cheerleading (Varsity, Club)
Golf (Varsity)
Dance (Varsity, Club)

Winter sports

Boys' and Girls' Hockey (Varsity, JV)
Boys' Swimming (Varsity)
Boys' and Girls' Indoor Track (Varsity, JV) 
Ski Team (Varsity, JV)
Boys' & Girls' Basketball (Varsity, JV, Freshman)
Cheerleading (Varsity, Club)
Gymnastics (Varsity, JV)
Wrestling (Varsity, JV)
Squash (Club)

Spring Sports

Lacrosse (Varsity, JV, Freshman)
Baseball (Varsity, JV, Freshman)
Softball (Varsity, JV, Freshman)
Tennis (Varsity, JV)
Spring Track
Boys' Volleyball (Varsity, JV)
Boys' Rugby (Varsity, JV)

Club Sports

The Ultimate Team was founded in 2001. It was ranked 9th in the country in 2004, 7th in 2007, and again 7th in 2010.  The team beat Amherst Regional High School March 24, 2007, ending ARHS' 4 year long win streak dating back to April 2003.  The State Finals of Needham vs. ARHS in 2007 was named by the Ultimate Players Association as the best State Finals ever played because of an epic collapse by The Rockets. Needham took an early lead and held it throughout the game until reaching 11–8, but preceded to fold to a strong Amherst side which stormed back with a 6–1 run to win 14–12.  The team reached the UPA High School Eastern Championships in 2007(T-3), 2009(T-7), 2010 (2nd), and 2011 (T-7). In both 2012 and 2013, the team came in second place at the USAU Northeasterns Championship losing to Amherst 13–2 and then Lexington 8–6. In 2013, the team beat ARHS in the semi-finals of the MA State Championship but lost again to Lexington, 11–9 in a rematch of the USAU Northeasterns Championship. The team is coached by alumni from the 2004 team, Dan Hourigan and Jimmy Foster, but throughout the fall and pre-spring seasons it is largely student run and directed. There is also a B-team which plays locally and Girls' Team formed in the spring of 2009.

The Needham Rugby team was established in 2007 by a group of male and female students interested in forming a rugby club at the high school. For the first year of the program, the club was only able to field a partial girls side, however since then, the program has grown and includes over 40 active members on the boys' roster. The boys' rugby team will be entering their sixth year as a Varsity sport, competing in the Massachusetts Interscholastic Athletic Association (MIAA). The boys' rugby club participates in the Division 1 Conference against BC High, St. Johns Prep, Bishop Hendricken, Xaverian, and Belmont High School. The girls' team that once folded is now trying to rebuild and establish themselves in the 2015 spring season as a club team. The head coach of the boys' team is Joshua Yankell.  Joshua played Club Rugby for Brandeis University.  He is a Rugby Certified Referee.

Football and Thanksgiving Rivalry
The football team is known as the Rockets. The school continues to participate in the oldest public high school rivalry in the nation, between Needham and Wellesley. The game is played every Thanksgiving and began in 1882 when Wellesley player Arthur Judson Oldman challenged the Needham team. The game was played at Wellesley's Morton Field and had little in common with modern football.  The rivalry has continued uninterrupted since the event, with Wellesley maintaining the slight edge, 61–59–9.  The Thanksgiving game of 2015, played at Fenway Park, resulted in the Rockets winning against the Raiders. The final score was 12–7.

Performing arts
The Dance Team is in its sixth year, and was only recently recognized as a Varsity Sport as opposed to a Club team. The team performs at football and basketball home games during halftime. In 2003 they came in first place at a National Competition in Orlando, Florida, and got to perform their routine before the Outback Bowl in front of 17,000 people. In 2009, the Dance Team won the state title, beating out fellow Bay State Conference rival Braintree. The Dance Team recently took home 1st place in both the 2011 Bay State conference as well as the 2011 State competition, once again beating out fellow rival Braintree. Needham High School frequently sends students to District, All-State, and All-National music festivals each year.

Other clubs and teams
The school has over thirty extracurricular clubs and activities including a School Newspaper, Speech and Debate Team, a Mock Trial Team, and several student-run a cappella groups. The school newspaper was established in 1957, and is titled The Hilltopper. The Four Square Club is the current world record-holder for the longest continuous four square game. Needham High School has a robotics club with four FIRST Tech Challenge teams, the HackHers, T-10, Delta V, and Liquid Oxygen, which frequently reach state competitions. T-10 also attended the Australian invitational competition in 2014, and advanced to super-regional competition in the 2015-2016 season. The school has a math team which participates in GBML (Greater Boston Mathematics League) and other competitions. Needham High School's extracurricular organizations are coordinated by faculty advisors although they have student-elected officials and are largely run by students.

Curricular offerings

Foreign languages
Classes are offered in French, Spanish, Mandarin Chinese, and Latin. The foreign language program offers beginning courses in all the languages as well as logical continuation sequences from the middle school language programs. French, Spanish, and Mandarin courses extend from introductory levels to Advanced Placement courses. A program called INDEX, short for independent exploration, allows high-ability and highly motivated students to pursue languages or levels which are not offered.

Science
The science department offers a laboratory-based science curriculum. The departmental sequence in science consists of biology in ninth grade, physics in tenth grade, chemistry in eleventh grade, and Advanced Placement and elective courses in the twelfth grade. AP courses are offered in chemistry, biology, and physics. Science elective courses offered at Needham High School include Environmental Science, 20th Century Physics, Marine Biology, Introduction to Astronomy, and Anatomy and Physiology.

Social studies
The social studies department requires students to complete a three-year sequence including World History (9th grade), World and American History (10th grade), and an American History course (11th grade). The social studies department also offers a  several elective majors, available for junior and senior students. These include Psychology and Sociology, Economics, the World Since 1945, American Legal System, and Chinese Traditions. The department offers three advanced placement courses: AP United States History, AP United States Government, and AP Psychology.

Mathematics
The mathematics department requires students to complete a three-year sequence including Algebra II (9th grade), Geometry (10th grade), and a pre-calculus (11th grade). Alternatively, students can complete the Algebra I (9th grade), Geometry (10th grade), and Algebra II (11th grade) sequence. AP level courses include AP Calculus AB and BC, and AP Statistics. In addition, Computer Science courses are offered at the introductory and AP levels. In 2013 an introductory robotics class was added as well.

Fine and performing arts
Along with elective fine arts courses in architectural design, graphic design, ceramics, photography, production printing,  the school offers a four-year art sequence. Additionally, the school offers several courses in the performing arts, such as Orchestra and Chorus. Certain music courses at Needham High Schools, such as Concert Chorale and Jazz Ensemble require an audition and have practices and rehearsals after school; additionally, there is an after-school chorus course for students who are not able to take chorus during the day. The Fine and Performing Arts department offers two Advanced Placement courses: AP Music Theory and AP Studio Art. Certain courses (particularly the second, third, and fourth-year courses) in the art sequence, as well as the AP Music Theory course, are weighted into a  student's GPA. As a graduation requirement, Needham High School requires that students complete the equivalent of two full year art courses.

Community classroom
As a graduation requirement, students must earn two community classroom credits. Students may earn one credit by either completing thirty hours of community service or alternatively by at least twelve hours of work per week for one semester during the school year. Community service opportunities include volunteer service as well as internships. Only one credit may be earned through work experience.

Associated programs

Needham is a member of the METCO Program, which allows Boston students to attend the school.

Notable alumni and teachers

 Charlie Baker, 72nd and current Governor of Massachusetts
 Marsha Bemko, executive producer of the Antiques Roadshow. Bemko first joined Roadshow in 1999 as a senior producer.
 Lee Eisenberg, film and television writer (Year One, The Office)
 Anna Parker Fessenden, botanist, taught math at Needham High School
 Robbie Ftorek, NHL coach and player, born and raised in Needham(Class of 1970)
 James S. Gracey, former Commandant of the United States Coast Guard
 Steven Hauschka, NFL kicker for the Buffalo Bills
 Eric Johnson, former NFL Tight End, most notably for the San Francisco 49ers. Currently married to singer Jessica Simpson.
 Richard Larson, professor at the Massachusetts Institute of Technology
 Phil Murphy, 56th and current Governor of New Jersey, former ambassador to Germany 2009-2013.
Marissa Nadler critically acclaimed musician and fine artist. 
 Aly Raisman, Olympic gold medalist for gymnastics in London 2012 and Rio 2016
 Karl Ravech, ESPN Baseball Tonight anchor, born and raised in Needham
 Sarah Saltzberg, actress/singer, star of Broadway's The 25th Annual Putnam County Spelling Bee
 Harry Swartz (born 1996), soccer player
 Mike Tannenbaum, Executive Vice President of Football Operations for the Miami Dolphins
 Jeff Taylor, founder of Monster.com
 Sunita Williams, graduated from Needham High School in 1983, U.S. Naval Academy graduate, currently a NASA astronaut
 Sean Buckley, television writer Harlem (TV Series)

Distinguished Career Award

The George A. Dennett Distinguished Career Award has been established to recognize former Needham High School students who have gone on to distinguished careers. They were first presented in 1990.

References
Needham High School October 2017 STM (1) October 2, 2017.

External links
Needham Public Schools website
Official Needham High School website

Class Websites
Needham High School Class of 1961 Official Site
Needham High School Class of 1961 Reunion Site
Needham High School Class of 1962 website
Needham High School Class of 1963 website
Needham High School Class of 1964 website      
Needham High School Class of 1965 website
Needham High School Class of 1966 website
Needham High School Class of 1967 & 1968 website
Needham High School Class of 1969 website
Needham High School Class of 1970 website
Needham High School Class of 1971 website
Needham High School Class of 1972 website
Needham High School Class of 1973 website
Needham High School Class of 1980 website

Buildings and structures in Needham, Massachusetts
Schools in Norfolk County, Massachusetts
Public high schools in Massachusetts
Bay State Conference
1898 establishments in Massachusetts
Educational institutions established in 1898